Total Divas is an American reality television series that premiered on July 28, 2013, on E!. The series gave viewers an inside look at the lives of WWE Divas from their work within WWE to their personal lives.

Production
In speculation of the seventh season of Total Divas, on May 16, 2017, it was announced that Eva Marie would not be returning as a series regular, and questions have been raised in regards to Paige remaining on the show. However, Brie, Nikki, Naomi, and Natalya will definitely return as series regulars for the upcoming season. Filming began in June 2017. On June 9, 2017, it was reported that Alexa Bliss and Nia Jax would be joining the upcoming season of Total Divas. However, the rest of the seventh season cast is still to be announced. On June 10, 2017, Renee Young confirmed via Twitter that she will not be returning for the seventh season. In a recent interview, it was confirmed Lana would be returning to the show for the upcoming season, along with her storyline of becoming an independent wrestler on the SmackDown brand. On June 29, 2017, it was reported that Carmella would be joining the cast and that Paige wouldn't be returning for the upcoming season. On September 20, 2017, E! revealed that the seventh season will premiere on November 1, 2017.

Cast

Main cast
 Brie Bella (Brianna Danielson)
 Naomi (Trinity Fatu)
 Natalya (Natalie Neidhart-Wilson)
 Nikki Bella (Stephanie Nicole Garcia-Colace)
 Lana (Catherine Perry)
 Maryse (Maryse Mizanin)
 Alexa Bliss (Alexis Kaufman)
 Carmella (Leah Van Dale)
 Nia Jax (Savelina Fanene)

Recurring cast
 Daniel Bryan (Brie's husband)
 Jimmy Uso (Naomi's husband)
 Tyson Kidd (Natalya's husband)
 Mark Carrano (WWE Senior Director of Talent Relations)
 Rusev (Lana's husband)
 The Miz (Maryse's husband)
 Jim Neidhart (Nattie's father)
 Ellie Neidhart (Nattie's mother)

Guest stars 
 Alicia Fox (Victoria Crawford)
 JoJo (Joseann Offerman)
 Renee Young (Renee Paquette)
 Big Cass (Carmella's boyfriend)
 Buddy Murphy (Alexa's fiancé)
 John Cena (Nikki's fiancé)
 Dean Ambrose (Jonathan "Jon" Good)
 Dolph Ziggler (Nicholas "Nick" Nemeth)
 Tamina (Sarona Snuka-Polamalu)
 Lilian Garcia (Former WWE Ring Announcer)
 Kathy Colace (Brie & Nikki's mother)
 J.J. Garcia (Brie & Nikki's brother)

Episodes

Ratings

References

External links

 
 

2017 American television seasons
2018 American television seasons
Total Divas